The  is a series of short stories by the Japanese writer Hideo Okuda which features the fictional psychiatrist .

Of these, Kūchū Buranko is particularly acclaimed, having won Okuda the 131st Naoki Prize (given for a book published in the first half of 2004). However, as of January 2011, only In the Pool has been published in English, though the other collections have been published in other languages, including German and French.

Works in other media based on the stories include a feature film, television drama, stage play and animated television series.

Premise

 is a psychiatrist of the Irabu General Hospital. He is fat and pale skinned, with a fetish for administering injections to patients. An unreasonable and rather immature person, in the story "Kūchū Buranko", he normally ignores Yamashita's plights while challenging him to mid-air trapeze flying due to his self-proclaimed "light-weightedness." During his student days, he frequently misunderstood his lectures. Treated as a general nuisance at the School of Medicine, he entered pediatrics soon after graduation. However, due to claims of his tantrums and quarrels with child patients, he switched to psychiatry instead. Doubts remain about his actual grades.

Stories and characters

Kūchū Buranko

 
  is a member of a circus troupe of seven years and is the leader of a flying trapeze team. Both his parents are fellow members. After suffering repeated failures on the trapeze act, he visits a psychiatrist on his wife's and fellow members' advice. Due to his failure during an act, he believes his partner is harassing him. He has been played by Masato Sakai in the television drama, Kenji Sakamoto in the stage play and Toshiyuki Morikawa in the animated series.
 
  is an underboss of the yakuza "Kioi family" from Shibuya. He suffers from such serious trypanophobia that he cannot use chopsticks and must instead use a spoon at meals. He takes a psychiatric test on his common-law wife's advice.
  (the first publishing "All Yomimono", October, 2003 issue)
  is a university lecturer and is a doctor of neurology working in a University-affiliated hospital. His father of law is the Dean of the School of Medicine, which supposedly could aid in his future employment prospects. A classmate of Irabu's during their college days. He has a type of obsessive-compulsive neurosis that compels him to force any place of tidiness into disarray. This disorder is so strong, that with just one glance at it, Ikeyama becomes agonized with the impulse of wanting to strip off his father-in-law's wig. Originally published in the All Yomimono with the title .
  (the first publishing "All Yomimono", April, 2003 issue)
  is a pro-baseball player and is ten-year veteran third baseman. He suffered from yips, and he leaves the first team by pretending to have an injured right shoulder.
 
  is a popular novelist known for her stories which "express the subtleties of the hearts of today's urban men and women." While working on her newest story, she becomes ill at ease with writing new material. After relapsing into a continued state of compulsive vomiting from which had previously been cured, she consults psychiatry.

Adaptations

Film
 is a 2005 feature film directed by Satoshi Miki, based on three of the stories by Hideo Okuda collected in the book of the same name, which stars Suzuki Matsuo as Irabu, Joe Odagiri as Tetsuya Taguchi and Seiichi Tanabe as Kazuo Ōmori. It was released in cinemas in Japan on May 14, 2005.

Television drama
 is a 2005 one-off television drama based primarily on the story of the same name by Hideo Okuda, which stars Hiroshi Abe as Irabu. It was produced by Fuji Television and broadcast by them on May 27, 2005.

 Cast
 Ichiro Irabu (Hiroshi Abe)
 Mayumi (Yumiko Shaku)
 Kohei Yamashita (Masato Sakai)
 Hiromi Yasukawa (Hitomi Satō)
 Seiji Ino (Kenichi Endō)
 Elly (Sachiko Kokubu)
 Uchida (Seiji Iinuma)
 Yoshimatsu (Yutaka Matsushige)

 Staff
 Planning: Akihiro Arai, Kenichiro Yasuhara (Fuji Television)
 Script: Hiroshi Hashimoto
 Producer: Shizuo Sekiguchi, Fumi Hashimoto (Kyodo Television)
 Direction: Masanori Murakami (Kyodo Television)
 Production: Fuji Television, Kyodo Television

Play
 is a 2008 play by Yutaka Kuramochi based on the story of the same name by Hideo Okuda. The original production by theatre company Atelier Duncan was directed by Masahiko Kawahara and ran for 21 performances from April 20 to May 5, 2008 at the Tokyo Metropolitan Art Space, then toured for the remainder of the month starting in Kōchi, Kōchi on the 8th and ending in Kamisu, Ibaraki on the 29th. The original cast included Hiroyuki Miyasako as Dr. Irabu, Eriko Satō as Mayumi, Kenji Sakamoto as Kōhei Yamashita, Yumiko Takahashi and Takashika Kobayashi, with supporting roles performed by, among others, the male idols Takashi Nagayama as Haruki, Ryūji Kamiyama and Ire Shiozaki and members of the G-Rockets acro troupe. It was produced with Dentsu and sponsored by Dentsu and TV Asahi.

A video recording was made, which premiered on July 11, 2008 on the television station WOWOW and has since been rebroadcast several times and released on DVD-Video on October 24, 2008.

Anime

 is a 2009 Japanese animated television series of 11 episodes based on the psychiatrist Irabu stories by Hideo Okuda, produced at Toei Animation under the series direction of Kenji Nakamura for Fuji Television's noitamina programming block. Though ostensibly an animated series, its visuals are more specifically a mélange of traditional animation with rotoscoped or otherwise processed live-action video and other imagery. Manabu Ishikawa's series composition adapts the stories to be set in Tokyo during about one week from December 17 to Christmas (corresponding with the original broadcast, which concluded on Christmas Eve) and for the chief characters of each story to appear also as supporting players in each other's.

The plot of each episode follows a common thread. Irabu is consulted by a patient suffering from a psychological problem or a problem where other medical approaches have been exhausted. Each of the patients' heads are morphed into an animal head in some scenes after Mayumi administers the vitamin shot to them. Each patient somehow ties into one another, for example the first patient meets with the second patient and the seventh patient, all in the first episode.

The series won the Pulcinella award for Best Television Series in the "Young Adults" (14–17 years) division at the 2010 Cartoons on the Bay international animation festival in the province of Genoa, Italy, the Gary Goldman-presided jury of that year commending it as a "unique representation of the complex inner world of adolescents.". Noted animation blogger Benjamin Ettinger found it to be lacking in interest in the animation itself and the extreme eclecticism of the visual design no substitute for the finely crafted world of Nakamura and character designer and chief animation director Takashi Hashimoto's earlier Ayakashi: Samurai Horror Tales and Mononoke but still highly enjoyable thanks to the excellence on the part of Nakamura and the episode directors with which the material has been handled and highlighted the incorporation of real-life gravure idol Yumi Sugimoto as Mayumi as a welcome subversion of moe.

 Staff
Screenplay: Manabu Ishikawa, Isao Murayama, Tomoko Taguchi
Art design: Shoji Tokiwa
Color setting: Rumiko Nagai
CG director: Nobuhiro Morita
Photography director: Kazuhiro Yamada
Sound director: Yukio Nagasaki
Music: Hideharu Mori
Assistance of the direction: Kimitoshi Chioka

 Theme songs
Opening theme: "Upside Down" by Denki Groove
Ending theme: "Shangri-La (Y.Sunahara 2009 Remodel)" by Denki Groove

Characters

  as Big & Middle Irabu
  as Little Irabu
 Dr. Irabu is the son of the founder of the Irabu General Hospital. Irabu is a psychiatrist with a care-free, eccentric, and childlike personality. He changes appearance throughout scenes. In his first form, he is slightly overweight, and wears bright clothes under his labcoat with a large green bear head that can change expression to suit his. "Middle Irabu" is slimmer, wearing his normal attire. In this form he has long blond hair, red glasses, and a pair of green bear ears. His personality in this form is notably effeminate. His final form is "little Irabu" (him as a boy), with an oversized lab coat, and shorts instead of trousers. He is quite mellow in this form, but can get ecstatic.
 Irabu has a strange angle to his line of medicine, insisting that all his patients have a vitamin shot (Irabu has a fetish for injections) and insisting that his patients face their problems head on. He is seen by other psychiatrists as obscene and childish, although his treatments seem to work.

 Performed by: Yumi Sugimoto
 A sullen nurse who serves as Irabu's assistant. She wears a revealing nurse's uniform and uses her sex appeal to distract patients while giving injections. In the episode "Friends" it's revealed that she prefers to be alone because it is easier, and that she's into men who are lone wolves, like her. She doesn't have a cell phone, but uses one at the end of episode 6 to contact with Yuta, the patient from the "Friends" episode.

 A psychiatrist who is not actually part of the story but frequently halts scenes and pops in via a door-like cut from the stopped picture to provide medical commentary.

 Performed by: Toshiyuki Morikawa
 He is an aerialist who repeats failure.

 Performed by: Takahiro Sakurai
 He is a public servant at the ward office who has a constantly erect penis, due to emotional issues at work and with his ex-wife.

 Performed by: Shin-ichiro Miki
 He is a romance novelist suffering from OCD, he believes that he has already done the ideas that come to his head for new books.

 Performed by: Daisuke Namikawa
 He is a pro-baseball player troubled with yips, brought on by a younger and popular contender for his spot.

 performed by: Hiroaki Hirata
 He is a college lecturer and is a doctor of neurology, he has compulsive obsessions to do destructive and strange things.

 Performed by: Miyu Irino
 He is a high school student, who has a mobile phone addiction.

 Performed by: Hiroki Takahashi
 He is a yakuza, who has an obsessive-compulsive fear of edges.

 Performed by: Mitsuo Iwata
 He is diagnosing him as obsessive-compulsive neurosis by himself.

 Performed by: Wataru Hatano
 He is an actor, worried about his self-image.

 Performed by: Ryotaro Okiayu
 He is the representative director chairman of the newspaper publishing company.

 Performed by: Tōru Furuya
 Assistant Manager of the Paramedic Department, Irabu General Hospital. Father of Yuta Tsuda.

References

External links

  at Pony Canyon International Licensing 

 TV drama official website 

 Stage play official website 

  
  at Siren Visual
 

Comic short stories
Japanese fiction
Literature of the late modern period
Psychiatric hospitals in fiction
Short story series
Works originally published in Japanese magazines
Works originally published in literary magazines
Stone Bridge Press books